Magic Mart was a chain of department/discount stores headquartered in Bluefield, Virginia. The chain was owned by Ammar's Inc., a private family-owned company.

Magic Mart had stores in Eastern Kentucky, Northeastern Tennessee, Southwest Virginia, Western and Central North Carolina and southern and western West Virginia.

Company history
Magic Mart was founded by the Ammar family. In 1920, the Ammar brothers opened Ammar Brothers' Department Store in Williamson, West Virginia. In 1967, the Ammars opened the first Magic Mart in Grundy, Virginia. Magic Mart became more successful and more numerous. The Ammar Brothers' Department Stores all closed by 1974.

In 1991, Magic Mart began to experiment with larger store size by expanding the Oceana, West Virginia store from 35,000 to 80,000 square feet. The largest store was in Lenoir, North Carolina at 110,000 square feet before it closed in August 2013.

On July 2, 2018, Ammar's announced that difficult economic conditions and slow sales forced the closure of the company. Liquidation began around July 15, 2018, with all Magic Mart stores closed around September 1, 2018.

Locations
Magic Mart has ceased all operations.
 

Magic Mart formerly operated 16 stores in three states:

North Carolina
Lexington
Virginia
Abingdon
Dryden
Bluefield
Galax
Grundy
North Tazewell
Norton
Pulaski
Richlands
Big Stone Gap

West Virginia
Beckley
Belle
Danville
Fairlea
Hinton
Oceana
Rainelle
Teays Valley
Welch
Kentucky
Hazard
Harlan

References

Defunct discount stores of the United States
Retail companies established in 1920
Retail companies disestablished in 2018
1920 establishments in West Virginia
2018 disestablishments in West Virginia
1967 establishments in Virginia
2018 disestablishments in Virginia
2018 disestablishments in North Carolina
2018 disestablishments in Kentucky
American companies established in 1920
American companies disestablished in 2018